The Republican Bloc (BR) is a political party in Benin, led by Abdoulaye Bio Tchané.
In the 2019 Beninese parliamentary election, the party came in second, winning 36 of 83 seats in the National Assembly.  Both the Republican Bloc and the majority-winning Progressive Union are allied with President Patrice Talon.

Electoral history

Parliamentary elections

Municipal elections

References

2018 establishments in Benin
Liberal parties in Africa
Political parties established in 2018
Political parties in Benin